Conductor clashing is the phenomenon where  conductors come in contact with one another during high wind speeds or gusts.

External forces

Conductor clashing may be assisted by the following external forces:
 Incorrect tensioning of the line during erection
 High winds, or gusts during extreme storms or hot weather
 Flora such as hazard trees breaking and falling onto wires
 Fauna such as birds causing wires to sag and/or clash
 Vehicles crashing into poles, causing poles to lean & wires to clash
 Vandalism such as articles thrown onto power lines causing wires to sag and/or clash.

References 

Electric power distribution
Electrical phenomena